"P-Poppin'" is the first single from Ludacris's fourth album Chicken-n-Beer. It features Shawnna and Lil Fate, and was jointly produced by Zukhan Bey and The Neptunes. The song samples "Danger (Been So Long)" by Mystikal, and depicts what goes on in a strip club and a dance that can be done with or without clothes.

Controversy
This song and Nelly's song "Tip Drill" were attacked for influencing younger audiences to be sexually active.  The chorus repeats, "Head down pussy pussy poppin'." The explicit version of the music video was not shown on MTV or BET because it was so sexually explicit, and there were several scenes of naked women. The words "pussy poppin'" were replaced by "booty poppin'" to make the lyrics less explicit. Some of the women posed sexually, exposing their vulvas, and Ludacris smacks their buttocks. The uncut version that BET and MTV showed allowed the words "pussy poppin'" to be said but the women were blurred; however, the video was still more explicit than the Tip Drill video. The song received limited airplay due to its lyrics.

Track listing

References

External links

2003 songs
2003 singles
Ludacris songs
Dirty rap songs
Def Jam Recordings singles
Songs written by Shawnna
Songs written by Ludacris
Songs written by Pharrell Williams
Songs written by Chad Hugo
Songs written by Mystikal